Robert Hagan may refer to:

 Robert E. Hagan (1921–1999), American politician in Ohio
 Bob Hagan (Robert F. Hagan, born 1940), his son, American politician in Ohio
 Robert Hagan (artist) (born 1947), Australian television personality, author and artist
 Robert Hagan (naval officer) (1794–?), officer in the British Royal Navy